Ostružná (until 1918 Špornava) is a municipality and village in Jeseník District in the Olomouc Region of the Czech Republic. It has about 200 inhabitants.

Administrative parts
Villages of Petříkov and Ramzová are administrative parts of Ostružná.

Sport
The Petříkov ski resort is located in the municipality.

References

Villages in Jeseník District
Czech Silesia